Roberto Kovac, (born 2 May 1990) is a Swiss professional basketball player. He has been a member of the Swiss national basketball team and participated at the 2015 EuroBasket qualification.

Club career
In August 2019, Kovac signed with Úrvalsdeild karla club ÍR. On 29 August it was reported that Kovac had signed a contract with Croatian club KK Cibona even though he was still under contract for the season with ÍR. In September, Cibona bought up Kovac's contract við ÍR. In December 2019, Kovac left Cibona and signed back with ÍR. He appeared in 10 games for Cibona in the A-1 Liga, averaging 6.4 points and 1.6 rebounds. He also appeared in 9 Liga ABA games for Cibona where he averaged 2.8 points in only 8.9 minutes per game.

National team career
On 21 August 2019, Kovac scored 29 points for Switzerland as it beat Iceland in the EuroBasket 2021 pre-qualification to advance to the main qualification stage.

References

External links
Eurobasket.com Profile
Career statistics at proballers.com

1990 births
Living people
Fribourg Olympic players
ÍR men's basketball players
KK Cibona players
Lions de Genève players
People from Mendrisio
Shooting guards
Swiss men's basketball players
Swiss people of Croatian descent
Úrvalsdeild karla (basketball) players
Sportspeople from Ticino